An afterglow in meteorology consists of several atmospheric optical phenomena, with a general definition as a broad arch of whitish or pinkish sunlight in the twilight sky, consisting of the bright segment and the purple light. Purple light mainly occurs when the Sun is 2-6° below the horizon, from civil to nautical twilight, while the bright segment lasts until the end of the nautical twilight. Afterglow is often in cases of volcanic eruptions discussed, while its purple light is discussed as a different particular volcanic purple light. Specifically in volcanic occurrences it is light scattered by fine particulates, like dust, suspended in the atmosphere. In the case of alpenglow, which is similar to the Belt of Venus, afterglow is used in general for the golden-red glowing light from the sunset and sunrise reflected in the sky, and in particularly for its last stage, when the purple light is reflected. The opposite of an afterglow is a foreglow, which occurs before sunrise.

Sunlight reaches Earth around civil twilight during golden hour intensely in its low-energy and low-frequency red component.
During this part of civil twilight after sunset and before sundawn the red sunlight remains visible by scattering through particles in the air. Backscattering, possibly after being reflected off clouds or high snowfields in mountain regions, furthermore creates a reddish to pinkish light. The high-energy and high-frequency components of light towards blue are scattered out broadly, producing the broader blue light of nautical twilight before or after the redish light of civil twilight, while in combination with the redish light producing the purple light. This period of blue dominating is referred to as the blue hour and is, like the golden hour, widely treasured by photographers and painters.

After the 1883 eruption of the volcano Krakatoa, a remarkable series of red sunsets appeared worldwide. An enormous amount of exceedingly fine dust were blown to a great height by the volcano's explosion, and then globally diffused by the high atmospheric winds. Edvard Munch's painting The Scream possibly depicts an afterglow during this period.

See also
 Airglow
 Belt of Venus
 Earth's shadow
 Gegenschein
 Red sky at morning
 Sunset

References

External links

Atmospheric optical phenomena
es:Arrebol
fi:Purppuravalo